Hans Vinjarengen (20 August 1905 – 1 February 1984) was a Nordic combined skier from Norway. He won a silver medal at the 1928 Winter Olympics in St. Moritz and a bronze at the 1932 Winter Olympics in Lake Placid, New York. In addition, he won gold medals at the 1929 and 1930 FIS Nordic World Ski Championships and bronzes in 1934 and 1938.

Vinjarengen won the Holmenkollen ski festival's Nordic combined event twice (1930 and 1932). In 1931, he shared the Holmenkollen medal with fellow Norwegian Ole Stensen, a cross-country skier. Vinjarengen lived most of his life in Oslo, where he worked as a lorry driver, but he represented his childhood club from Nordre Land.

References

External links

Holmenkollen medalists – click Holmenkollmedaljen for downloadable pdf file 
Holmenkollen winners since 1892 – click Vinnere for downloadable pdf file 
databaseOlympics

1905 births
1984 deaths
Norwegian male Nordic combined skiers
Olympic Nordic combined skiers of Norway
Nordic combined skiers at the 1928 Winter Olympics
Nordic combined skiers at the 1932 Winter Olympics
Olympic silver medalists for Norway
Olympic bronze medalists for Norway
Holmenkollen medalists
Holmenkollen Ski Festival winners
Olympic medalists in Nordic combined
FIS Nordic World Ski Championships medalists in Nordic combined
Medalists at the 1928 Winter Olympics
Medalists at the 1932 Winter Olympics
People from Nordre Land
Sportspeople from Innlandet
20th-century Norwegian people